Izabela Hannah is a Polish-born British ballroom and Latin American dancer.  Born in Szczecin, Poland, Hannah began dancing jazz and ballet at the age of 9, and started ballroom and Latin American dancing as a teenager.  During her competitive career she won international titles in Europe and the United States, winning the Polish Amateur Ballroom Championships in 2001 and again in 2002.

In 2005, Hannah appeared as a professional dancer in the third series of the British BBC TV talent show Strictly Come Dancing, partnered with former snooker world champion Dennis Taylor.  Described as "Strictly Come Dancing's very own odd couple", the pair survived five weeks in the competition.  In 2009, Hannah joined other Strictly Come Dancing professionals on Brendan Cole's UK tour 'Live and Unjudged'.

Hannah married English businessman David Rai after appearing on the show in 2005, and has since built a successful Ballroom Dance Coaching and Wedding First Dance business in the UK. Through her dance school, Izabela Dance School Hannah  offers Dance Classes and Private dance lessons in Ballroom, Latin-American and Salsa style in London, Richmond, Kingston and Surrey. Her clientele includes beginners, social dancers to high level competitors and professional couples.

Hannah has also released a number of best selling Ballroom Dance Tutorial DVDs including WeddingFD - step by step Wedding First Dance programme and THE RUMBA - The Ultimate Dance Class. She also provides Ballroom and Latin-American demonstrations, Ballroom and Latin-American shows, lectures and judges Ballroom and Latin-American competitions around the world.

References

Sources

Living people
British ballroom dancers
Polish ballroom dancers
1976 births
Sportspeople from Szczecin
British female dancers
Polish female dancers
Polish expatriates in England